K. Rajah Iyer (15 July 1890 – 18 February 1974) was an Indian lawyer of the Madras High Court who served as Advocate-General of Madras Presidency from July 1945 to 1950. He was educated at the Presidency College, Madras. Rajah Iyer was on the bench when the Lakshmikanthan Murder Case trial took place.

References 

 

1890 births
1974 deaths
Presidency College, Chennai alumni
Advocates General for Tamil Nadu
20th-century Indian lawyers